Striysko-Syanskaya Verkhovina – part of Eastern Beskids within Sambir  and Stryi Raions, Lviv Oblast.
The Carpathians are a "subsystem" of a bigger Alps-Himalaya System that stretches from the western Europe all the way to southern Asia, and are further divided into "provinces" and "subprovinces". There are three major provinces (regions): Western Carpathians, Eastern Carpathians, and Southern Carpathians.
Striysko-Syanskaya Verkhovina is part of the Eastern Carpathians and is located in the upper reaches of rivers Opir River, Stryi River and San River.
On the territory there Protected areas Nadsyansky Regional Landscape Park, zakaznik "Pikui" and zakaznik Berdo.

Gallery

References

External links 
 Ukrainian-Polish Tourist Portal, Ridges and peaks of the Ukrainian Carpathians, Stryisko-Sanska Verkhovyna
 Divisions of the Carpathians

Lviv Oblast